Zipora Rubin-Rosenbaum (born 1946) is an Israeli athlete who has won 30 Paralympic medals. She has represented Israel at the Summer Paralympic Games seven times and has competed in athletics, swimming, table tennis, and wheelchair basketball at the Games.

Paralympics

Her first appearance came at the 1964 Summer Paralympics, the second ever Paralympics, held in Tokyo, Japan. Zipora competed in five events and won a medal in each; three athletics field events; the women's doubles table tennis, alongside playing partner Mishani; and 50 metre freestyle swimming. She took gold in the women's shot put D, setting a new world record of 5.16 metres. She also won bronze medals in the javelin, discus and table tennis and a silver in her swimming event behind compatriot Mishani.

At the 1968 Summer Paralympics in Tel Aviv Rubin-Rosenbaum won a further four gold medals and a silver medal, all in athletics. In the 1972 Games, hosted in Heidelberg, West Germany, she won a gold medal in javelin with a new world record of 18.5 metres, and also won a silver medal in the shot put. In the Toronto Games Rubin-Rosenbaum defended her title in javelin,  and also won gold medals in pentathlon and discus, as well as a silver in shot put. She won her fourth Paralympic javelin gold medal in 1980, also taking the bronze medal in shot put.

In the 1984 Summer Paralympics she again won 2 gold and 2 silver medals in athletic fields. In 1988 in Seoul and won three more medals, a gold in javelin and bronzes in both pentathlon and shot put. Her final Paralympics came in 1992 in Barcelona where she finished eighth in the javelin THS2 event and thirteenth in the THS2 shot put.

She was a member of the national women wheelchair basketball team and competed in wheelchair basketball at the Paralympic Games from 1968 to 1988, winning 2 gold medals, 2 silver medals and 1 bronze medal.

See also
 Israel at the Paralympics
 List of multiple Paralympic gold medalists

References

External links
 

1946 births
Living people
Israeli female swimmers
Israeli female discus throwers
Israeli female javelin throwers
Israeli female shot putters
Israeli table tennis players
Israeli women's wheelchair basketball players
Paralympic swimmers of Israel
Paralympic athletes of Israel
Paralympic table tennis players of Israel
Paralympic wheelchair basketball players of Israel
Paralympic gold medalists for Israel
Paralympic silver medalists for Israel
Paralympic bronze medalists for Israel
Paralympic medalists in athletics (track and field)
Paralympic medalists in swimming
Paralympic medalists in table tennis
Paralympic medalists in wheelchair basketball
Wheelchair category Paralympic competitors
Athletes (track and field) at the 1964 Summer Paralympics
Athletes (track and field) at the 1968 Summer Paralympics
Athletes (track and field) at the 1972 Summer Paralympics
Athletes (track and field) at the 1976 Summer Paralympics
Athletes (track and field) at the 1980 Summer Paralympics
Athletes (track and field) at the 1988 Summer Paralympics
Athletes (track and field) at the 1992 Summer Paralympics
Swimmers at the 1964 Summer Paralympics
Swimmers at the 1968 Summer Paralympics
Table tennis players at the 1964 Summer Paralympics
Wheelchair basketball players at the 1968 Summer Paralympics
Wheelchair basketball players at the 1972 Summer Paralympics
Wheelchair basketball players at the 1976 Summer Paralympics
Wheelchair basketball players at the 1980 Summer Paralympics
Wheelchair basketball players at the 1984 Summer Paralympics
Wheelchair basketball players at the 1988 Summer Paralympics
Medalists at the 1964 Summer Paralympics
Medalists at the 1968 Summer Paralympics
Medalists at the 1972 Summer Paralympics
Medalists at the 1976 Summer Paralympics
Medalists at the 1980 Summer Paralympics
Medalists at the 1984 Summer Paralympics
Medalists at the 1988 Summer Paralympics
Track and field athletes with disabilities
Sportswomen with disabilities
Female table tennis players
Wheelchair discus throwers
Wheelchair javelin throwers
Wheelchair shot putters
Paralympic discus throwers
Paralympic javelin throwers
Paralympic shot putters